

Cynemund (died  894) was a medieval Bishop of Hereford. He was elected in 888 and died between 888 and 901.

Notes

Citations

References

External links
 

Bishops of Hereford
9th-century English bishops
894 deaths
Year of birth unknown
9th-century English clergy